The men's +100 kg judo event at the 2015 European Games in Baku took place on 27 June.

Results

Finals

Repechage

Pool A

Pool B

Pool C

Pool D

References

External links
 
 

M101
2015